Mary Magdalene is a 1616–1618 painting by the Italian baroque artist Artemisia Gentileschi. It hangs in the Pitti Palace in Florence.

Description 
The figure is portrayed in a gown of yellow silk, pushing away a mirror (a symbol of vanity) inscribed with the words Optimam partem elegit (“you have chosen the best part”). The quote is derived from the Bible, Luke 10: 41–42, in which Jesus teaches Martha that her sister Mary has made a better choice in embracing a spiritual life - a quote highly relevant to the subject. The work is signed "Artimisia Lomi" on the wooden upright of the chair, although this signature may be that of a later hand. The painting is constructed from three pieces of canvas, with the strip running down the left hand side (which includes the chair upon which the signature is found) a possible later addition.

Interpretation
This depiction blends elements from two different biblical women: Mary, the sister of Lazarus (as referenced by the quotation) and Mary Magdalene, signified by the jar of ointment at her feet.  The luxuriousness of the women's clothing is thought to signal the artist's willingness to adapt her work to the tastes of her patrons.

History
The work was likely commissioned by the Grand Duchess Maria Maddalena, wife of Cosimo II de Medici. The painting is first mentioned as part of the Pitti Collection in 1826. The painting was restored in 1970 prior to an exhibition.

References 

1610s paintings
Paintings by Artemisia Gentileschi
Paintings in the collection of the Galleria Palatina
Paintings depicting Mary Magdalene